Naci or NACI may refer to:

Given name
 Ali Naci Karacan (1896–1955), Turkish journalist and publisher
 Muallim Naci (1850–1893), Ottoman-Turkish writer, poet, teacher and critic
 Naci Bostancı (born 1957), Turkish politician and academic
 Naci Eldeniz (1875–1948), Turkish Army general
 Naci Erdem (born 1931), Turkish footballer
 Naci Özgüç (born 1964), Turkish conductor
 Naci Şensoy (born 1958), Turkish-Kosovar football manager
 Naci Taşdöğen (born 1962), Turkish actor
 Naci Tınaz (1882–1964), Ottoman officer and Turkish Army general
 Ömer Naci Soykan (born 1945), Turkish philosopher

Other uses
 "Nací Orishas", a 2005 single by Orishas
 National Archives of the Cook Islands (NACI)
 National Advisory Committee on Immunization (NACI Canada)
 North Albion Collegiate Institute, Toronto High school

See also

Nacy (disambiguation)
NaCl (disambiguation)
NAC1 (disambiguation)
Nasi (disambiguation)
Naki (disambiguation)
Naji, a related given name
Nazism
 

Turkish masculine given names